Wyangle, New South Wales is a bounded rural locality west of Canberra, Australia and about 16 km. north-east of Tumut.

Wyangle is also a civil Parish of Buccleuch County.

Wyangle is located at 35°12′54″S 148°23′04″E  and is in the Snowy Valleys Council Area.

References

Localities in New South Wales
Geography of New South Wales
Parishes of Buccleuch County